Local elections in Kebbi State were held on 5 February 2022. All 22 councils in the state were up for election.

References

See also 

Kebbi State local elections
February 2022 events in Africa
2022 local elections in Nigeria